Hadrianów  is a settlement in the administrative district of Gmina Zduny, within Krotoszyn County, Greater Poland Voivodeship, in west-central Poland.

References

Villages in Krotoszyn County